The International African Service Bureau (IASB) was a pan-African organisation founded in London in 1937 by West Indians George Padmore, C. L. R. James, Amy Ashwood Garvey, T. Ras Makonnen and Kenyan nationalist Jomo Kenyatta and Sierra Leonean labour activist and agitator I. T. A. Wallace-Johnson. Chris Braithwaite (also known as Jones), was Secretary of this organisation. 

The bureau emerged from the International African Friends of Abyssinia (Ethiopia) and intended to address issues relating to Africa and the African diaspora to the British general public. Similar in design and organization to the West African Youth League, the IASB also sought to inform the public about the grievances faced by those in colonial Africa and created a list of desired reforms and freedoms that would help the colonies. The bureau also hoped to encourage new  African trade unions to affiliate themselves with the British labour movement. To further its interest, it held weekly meetings at Hyde Park, where members discussed labor strikes in the Caribbean and Ethiopia. It also supplied speakers to branches of the Labour Party, trade unions and the League of Nations Union and provided questions to be asked in front of Parliament regarding legislation, working conditions and trade union regulations.

The IASB journal, International African Opinion, was edited by C. L. R. James.

In 1939 the IASB worked alongside the League of Coloured Peoples and the West African Students Union to campaign against the colour bar introduced by Adjutant-General Robert Gordon-Finlayson in the British Army.

The organisation lasted until about 1945.

References
 .
 
 .

Notes

External links
The African diaspora: global solidarity in inter-war Britain

Pan-Africanist organizations in Europe
Organizations established in 1937
Pan-Africanism in the United Kingdom
Culture of the African diaspora